Shah Abdul Ahad Afzali was the Governor of Ghor from 2005 to 2007, being the third governor after the fall of the Taliban government. 
He was born in Badakhshan city of Daraim in northern Afghanistan and emigrated with many of his companions to neighbouring country Tajikistan in 1994 until 2003.
He was very active in Tajikistan and created many schools and other opportunities for Afghan children and youths.

References

Living people
Governors of Ghor Province
Year of birth missing (living people)